The City Council of Barcelona (Catalan: Ajuntament de Barcelona; Spanish: Ayuntamiento de Barcelona) is the top-tier administrative and governing body of the municipality of Barcelona, Catalonia, Spain. In terms of political structure, it consists of the invested Mayor of Barcelona, currently Ada Colau, the Government Commission, and an elected 41-member deliberative Plenary (Consell Municipal) with scrutiny powers.

Mayor 

The Mayor is elected by the members of the plenary among its members the day the new municipal corporation is formed after the local election. The officeholder has a mandate for the 4-year duration of the elected body. If the Mayor leaves office ahead of time a new voting may take place among the plenary members in order to invest a new mayor (meanwhile, another local councillor, conventionally the first deputy mayor, may act as acting Mayor). Since 13 June 2015 the Mayor is Ada Colau. The opening session in which the Mayor is invested is traditionally held at the Saló de Cent.

Government Commission 
The Government Commission (Comissió de Govern; also Junta de Govern or Junta de Gobierno) is formed by the Mayor, the Deputy Mayors, and a number of appointed councillors.

Municipal Council 
The municipal council (Consell Municipal) is the body formed by the elected councillors of the Ajuntament. The plenary meetings (Ple) are held at the "Carles Pi i Sunyer" Hall. It is formed by the municipal councillors, elected through closed party list proportional representation. 41 councillors are currently elected on the basis of the population of the municipality. Councillors are grouped in Municipal Groups on the basis of their political filiation. The Municipal Council can also meet in Commissions (akin to parliamentary committees).

A list of local elections (electing the councillors of the Plenary) since the restoration of the democratic system is presented as follows:
 Barcelona City Council election, 1979 (43 councillors)
 Barcelona City Council election, 1983 (43 councillors)
 Barcelona City Council election, 1987 (43 councillors)
 Barcelona City Council election, 1991 (43 councillors)
 Barcelona City Council election, 1995 (41 councillors)
 Barcelona City Council election, 1999 (41 councillors)
 Barcelona City Council election, 2003 (41 councillors)
 Barcelona City Council election, 2007 (41 councillors)
 Barcelona City Council election, 2011 (41 councillors)
 Barcelona City Council election, 2015 (41 councillors)
 Barcelona City Council election, 2019 (41 councillors)

Public bodies and companies 
A part of the management is conducted by entities wholly or partially owned by the Ajuntament:
Autonomous bodies
 Institut Municipal de Persones amb Discapacitat
 Institut Municipal d'Informàtica de Barcelona
 Institut Municipal d'Hisenda
 Institut Municipal de Mercats de Barcelona
 Institut Municipal d'Educació de Barcelona
 Institut Municipal del Paisatge Urbà i la Qualitat de Vida
 Institut Municipal Barcelona Esports
 Institut Municipal de Serveis Socials de Barcelona
Public business entities
 Institut Municipal Fundació Mies van der Rohe
 Institut Municipal de l'Habitatge i Rehabilitació
 Institut Municipal de Parcs i Jardins
 Institut Municipal d'Urbanisme
 Institut de Cultura de Barcelona
Limited companies
 Barcelona Cicle de l'Aigua, SA - BCASA
 Informació i Comunicació de Barcelona, SA
 Barcelona Activa SAU SPM
 Barcelona de Serveis Municipals, SA - BSM
 Parc d'Atraccions Tibidabo, SA
 Tractament i Seleccions de Residus, SA - TERSA
 Selectives Metropolitanes, SA - SEMESA
 Solucions Integrals pels Residus, SA - SIRESA
 Cementiris de Barcelona, SA
 Mercabarna
 Barcelona d'Infraestructures Municipals, SA - BIMSA
 Foment de Ciutat, SA
Consortiums, foundations and associations
 Fundació Museu Picasso de Barcelona
 Fundació Barcelona Institute of Technology for the Habitat
 Associación Red Internacional de Ciudades Educadoras
 Institut Infància y Adolescència de Barcelona, C.
 Consorci Campus Interuniversitari Diagonal-Besòs
 Agència d'Ecologia Urbana de Barcelona
 Agència Local de l'Energia de Barcelona
 Consorci del Besòs
 Consorci de Biblioteques de Barcelona
 Consorci Mercat de les Flors
 Consorci Localret
 Consorcio Museu de Ciències Naturals de Barcelona
 Consorci Museu d'Art Contemporani de Barcelona
 Consorci de L'Auditori y la Orquestra
 Fundació Barcelona Cultura
 Fundació Navegació Oceànica de Barcelona
 Fundació Carles Pi i Sunyer d'Estudis Autonòmics i Locals
 Fundación Privada Julio Muñoz Ramonet
 Fundació Barcelona Mobile World Capital Foundation
 Red de Juderías de España, Caminos de Sefarad
 Agència de Salut Pública de Barcelona
 Consorci Institut d’Infància i Món Urbà
 Consorci Campus Interuniversitari del Besòs
 Agència d'Ecologia Urbana de Barcelona
 Agència Local de l'Energia de Barcelona
 Consorci del Besòs
 Consorci de Biblioteques de Barcelona
 Consorci del Mercat de les Flors/Centre de les Arts de Moviment
 Consorci El Far
 Consorci Local Localret
Foundations and associations
Fundació Barcelona Cultura
Fundació Navegación Oceánica de Barcelona
Asociación Red Internacional de Ciudades Educadoras

See also 
 Local government in Spain
 Street names in Barcelona
 Urban planning of Barcelona

Notes

References 

Government of Barcelona
Barcelona